The Untouchable is the fourth studio album by American rapper Scarface. The album was released on March 11, 1997, by Rap-A-Lot Records and Noo Trybe Records. The album debuted at number one on the Billboard 200 chart for the first time in his career with the album; in addition it peaked at the top of the Top R&B/Hip-Hop Albums chart for two weeks, giving Scarface his second number one album there. The album sold 169,000 copies in its first week.

The album includes the hit single "Smile", featuring 2Pac. It peaked at number 12 on the Billboard Hot 100 and is the only single released by Scarface to go Gold.

Commercial performance
The album was certified Platinum by the RIAA on May 16, 1997.

Track listing

Charts

Weekly charts

Year-end charts

Certifications

See also
List of number-one albums of 1997 (U.S.)
List of number-one R&B albums of 1997 (U.S.)

References

1997 albums
Scarface (rapper) albums
Albums produced by Dr. Dre
Albums produced by N.O. Joe
Albums produced by Mike Dean (record producer)
Rap-A-Lot Records albums
Mafioso rap albums